Tree diagram may refer to:
 Tree structure, a way of representing the hierarchical nature of a structure in a graphical form

Mathematics and logic
 Tree diagram (probability theory), a diagram to represent a probability space in probability theory
 Decision tree, a decision support tool that uses a tree-like graph or model of decisions and their possible consequences
 Event tree, inductive analytical diagram in which an event is analyzed using Boolean logic
 Game tree, a tree diagram used to find and analyze potential moves in a game

Linguistics
 Language tree, representation of a group of languages related through descent from a common ancestor
 Parse tree, a representation of the syntactic structure of a string according to some formal grammar in linguistics
 Sentence diagram, a pictorial representation of the grammatical structure of a sentence showing the relationships of phrase structures

Biology
 Dendrogram, a tree diagram used to illustrate clusters of genes or samples in computational biology 
 Phylogenetic tree, a branching diagram showing the inferred evolutionary relationships among various biological species

Other uses
 Attack tree, conceptual diagrams showing how a target might be attacked
 Fault tree diagram, diagram used in deductive failure analysis in various industries
 Program structure tree, hierarchical diagram that displays the organization of a computer program
 Treemapping, a method for displaying hierarchical data using nested figures, usually rectangles.

See also

 Tree topology, a topology based on a hierarchy of nodes in a computer network
 Tree diagram (physics), an acyclic Feynman diagram, pictorial representations of the mathematical expressions governing the behavior of subatomic particles
 Outliners, a common software application that is used to generate tree diagrams
 Network diagram
 Tree (disambiguation)
 Descent (disambiguation)